Train Train may refer to:
 Train+Train, a 2000 Japanese light novel series
 Train*Train, a manga by Eiki Eiki
 "Train, Train" (The Count Bishops song), 1976
 "Train, Train", a song by Blackfoot from the 1979 album Strikes
 Train-Train (album), an album by The Blue Hearts
 "Train-Train", a song by The Blue Hearts